The World Tag Team Championship, originally known as the World Wrestling Federation Tag Team Championship, was a professional wrestling World Tag Team championship in World Wrestling Entertainment (WWE). It was unified with the WWE Tag Team Championship, which WWE recognized as the "Unified WWE Tag Team Championship". On August 16, 2010, the World Tag Team Championship was decommissioned in favor of continuing the lineage of the WWE Tag Team Championship.

Some reigns were held by champions using a ring name, while others used their real name. There have been a total of 113 recognized teams and 164 recognized individual champions, who have had a combined 176 official reigns. The first champions were Luke Graham and Tarzan Tyler and the final champions were The Hart Dynasty (David Hart Smith and Tyson Kidd).

The team with the most reigns is The Dudley Boyz (Bubba Ray Dudley and D-Von Dudley) with eight. Edge has the most individual reigns with 12. Two tag teams have held the titles for 365 or more days: Demolition, whose first reign set the record at 478 days and The Valiant Brothers.  Demolition is also the team with the longest combined reign at 698 days, while Mr. Fuji has the longest combined reign as an individual at 932 days.

The following is a chronological list of teams that have been World Tag Team Champions by ring name.

Title history

Names

Reigns

Combined reigns

By team

1

By wrestler

See also 
 List of former championships in WWE
 Tag team championships in WWE

References

External links
Official World Tag Team Championship Title History
Wrestling-Titles.com: WWE World Tag Team Title

WWE tag team champion lists